Sarah Frances Price (1849 – 3 July 1903) was an American botanist and scientific illustrator. Price discovered many rare plants and is credited with classifying a large portion of Kentucky's flora. Also an artist, she drew about fifteen hundred southern plants in pencil and watercolor.

Biography 
Price was born in 1849 in Evansville, Indiana, the third child of Alexander Price and Maria Price. Soon after Price was born, her family moved to Kentucky. With the onset of the American Civil War, the family moved to Indiana and taught at church-run schools including the Episcopal Church school St. Agnes Hall. At the end of the Civil War, the Prices returned to Bowling Green, Kentucky.

During her career, Price published over forty scientific papers. A lifelong botanist, she had a private herbarium with about 2000 plants in it. Several of her drawings were showcased at the World's Columbian Exposition, where she won several awards. Price drew over one-hundred fifty birds, and over one thousand plants. She also discovered several new species, including plants in the genera Aster, Apios, Cornus, Clematis and Oxalis. In 1897, she published her best known work, Fern Collectors Handbook and Herbarium. Five species are named after her: Apios priceana, Cornus priceae, Viola priceana, Symphyotrichum priceae and Oxalis priceana.

Price died on 3 July 1903.

References

External links 
Sarah Frances Price Papers

1849 births
1903 deaths
American women botanists
American botanists
Kentucky women botanists